The Men's Freestyle 52 kg at the 1980 Summer Olympics as part of the wrestling program were held at the Athletics Fieldhouse, Central Sports Club of the Army.

Medalists

Tournament results 
The competition used a form of negative points tournament, with negative points given for any result short of a fall. Accumulation of 6 negative points eliminated the loser wrestler. When only three wrestlers remain, a special final round is used to determine the order of the medals.

Legend
TF — Won by Fall
IN — Won by Opponent Injury
DQ — Won by Passivity
D1 — Won by Passivity, the winner is passive too
D2 — Both wrestlers lost by Passivity
FF — Won by Forfeit
DNA — Did not appear
TPP — Total penalty points
MPP — Match penalty points

Penalties
0 — Won by Fall, Technical Superiority, Passivity, Injury and Forfeit
0.5 — Won by Points, 8-11 points difference
1 — Won by Points, 1-7 points difference
2 — Won by Passivity, the winner is passive too
3 — Lost by Points, 1-7 points difference
3.5 — Lost by Points, 8-11 points difference
4 — Lost by Fall, Technical Superiority, Passivity, Injury and Forfeit

Round 1

Round 2

Round 3

Round 4

Round 5

Round 6

Final 

Results from the preliminary round are carried forward into the final (shown in yellow).

Final standings

References

External links
Official Report

Freestyle 52kg